The Finger Ridges are several mainly ice-free ridges and spurs extending over a distance of about , east–west, in the northwestern part of the Cook Mountains in Antarctica. They were mapped by the United States Geological Survey from tellurometer surveys and Navy air photos, 1959–63, and named descriptively by the Advisory Committee on Antarctic Names.

See also 
Harper Ridge

References 

Ridges of Oates Land